The Fire Service College is responsible for providing leadership, management and advanced operational training courses for senior fire officers from the United Kingdom and foreign fire authorities. It is located at Moreton-in-Marsh in Gloucestershire, England. It has been owned by Capita since February 2013, having previously been an executive agency and trading fund of the Department for Communities and Local Government.

The college provides the full range of training for firefighters at all levels, including initial training for recruit firefighters. Scotland closed its own Scottish Fire Service College in 2015 and set up the Scottish Fire and Rescue Service National Training Centre near Cambuslang. As a result many Scottish fire officers go to Moreton-in-Marsh for more specialist and senior ranking courses.

The college has a wide range of facilities for theoretical education and practical training in firefighting, fire safety and accident and emergency work.

History
Under the Fire Brigades Act 1938, the UK Government set up a training centre at Saltdean near Brighton in 1941, to train National Fire Service personnel. With the return to local authority control after World War II, the British government decided to standardise the way in which the fire service worked. The college at Saltdean became too small and the Home Office opened the Senior Staff College at Wotton House, Dorking in Surrey in 1949, to train senior officers from all over the country. On 4 June 1966, they decided to do the same for the lower ranks and established the Fire Service Technical College at Moreton-in-Marsh on a disused RAF wartime airfield about  outside the town. In 1981, the Staff College in Dorking closed and amalgamated with the Technical College to form the Fire Service College on the Moreton-in-Marsh site.

RAF Moreton-in-Marsh was, as the home station of 21 Operational Training Unit, RAF Bomber Command responsible for the training of aircrew to fly Wellington bombers. The Station also flew operations, and sent aircraft on the large bomber raids on the German cities of Cologne, Dresden and Hamburg. The airbase remained operational until the late 1950s. The government then used the base to teach fire fighting to military personnel undergoing their National Service.

The Home Office opened the college on the  site in 1968.  The first students whilst having most of the facilities seen today had no proper accommodation and were bunked in large huts (in the area that is now the cricket and football pitches), which originally housed the RAF personnel when it was an operational airbase. The Staff College at Dorking was closed in 1981 and all training was transferred to Moreton-in-Marsh.

In April 1992, the college became an executive agency and trading fund under the Fire Service Trading Fund Order 1992 (Statutory Instrument 1992 No. 640). In June 2001, the responsibility for the college transferred from the Home Office to the Department for Transport, Local Government and the Regions and just one year later to the Office of the Deputy Prime Minister and then to the Department for Communities and Local Government.

On 16 May 2009, a fire broke out at one of the appliance bays in the college, destroying 11 fire engines at a cost of £116,000 each. The blaze was not suspicious.

In April 2011, the Government announced it was studying different options for private investment in the college to allow it to achieve its full potential and in March 2012 it was concluded that the best option was full privatisation. In December 2012, Capita was selected as the preferred bidder and the sale was completed for £10 million on 28 February 2013.

Education
Educationally, the college has lecture facilities and specialised areas such as IT suites, a chemistry laboratory and hydraulics laboratory. The tutors are drawn from both the academic world and from officers serving in fire and rescue services around the country. Courses available range from firefighter recruits through junior officer development to senior officer management courses right up to chief officer level. To support the educational side, there as a large administration complex and a library of fire related literature. Students come mainly from the UK but several countries also send students.

Operational training
Operational training is carried out in several purpose built areas of the college, including: 

Breathing apparatus complex
Industrial complexes
Domestic property
High rise property
Areas for electrical, pool fire and fixed installation training
Small-scale versions of petroleum and chemical installations
A concrete "ship", the “Sir Henry”
A railway, which includes a section of rail with locomotives and carriages of various types, both passenger and freight.
 A mock motorway (M96)
 USAR (Urban Search and Rescue)
 A range of aircraft including helicopters, military and civil passenger aircraft including a simulated Boeing 747
 Fire behaviour units

To support the operational training the college has a fully equipped appliance room with a number of appliances from different manufacturers including pumps, aerial appliances, rescue tenders, USAR vehicles and hazmats appliances. There is also a large workshop to maintain the appliances and all the other operational equipment used.

The M96 motorway is a  stretch of road at the college which imitates in detail a typical UK motorway; it is used to teach firefighters in training how to deal with road traffic incidents. It consists of one of the former runways of the airfield. The numbering of the motorway is not consistent with the Great Britain road numbering scheme; however its number is largely irrelevant, as it is not open to the public.

Social
The social and domestic facilities include
Standard and deluxe accommodation for 600 students
Television rooms and lounge areas
Chapel
The 'Four Shires' Restaurant and bar complex
Sports complex with a  swimming pool, sauna, four squash courts a sports hall and fitness suite
Several football and cricket pitches
Two tennis courts

Other uses
The college site is also home to the Fire Protection Association (FPA).

In 2003, the BBC used the location to film the docudrama The Day Britain Stopped about a series of catastrophic transport accidents. For the purposes of the programme, the motorway was temporarily rebranded "M91".

The college has been on occasions shut over weekends and used by the military and police for training, as the live fire buildings and complexes allow training in certain operational areas that cannot easily be carried out or reconstructed elsewhere.

In November 2016, the site was used by HTIS for an Airsoft Military Simulation event called Blue Fox II.

On 8 December 2018, the first Fire Service College parkrun was held on the site. The parkrun no longer takes place as it did not resume following the restarting of parkrun's during the COVID-19 pandemic due to new security restrictions on the site.

See also
 New Dimension programme
 UK Government Decontamination Service
 Women in firefighting

References

External links

Education in Gloucestershire
Privatised executive agencies of the United Kingdom government
Firefighting academies
Emergency management in the United Kingdom
Fire and rescue in the United Kingdom
Moreton-in-Marsh